A boycott is an organized ostracism as a means of protest.

Boycott may also refer to:

People

 Arthur Boycott (1877-1938), British pathologist and naturalist
 Charles Boycott (1832–1897), a British land agent whose ostracism by his local community in Ireland gave rise to the word boycott
 Clare Boycott (born 1993), English cricketer
 Sir Geoffrey Boycott (born 1940), English cricketer
 Rosie Boycott, Baroness Boycott (born 1951), British journalist

Places
 Boycott, Buckinghamshire, a village in the United Kingdom

Arts and entertainment
 Boycott (1930 film), a German film directed by Robert Land
 Boycott (1985 film), an Iranian film directed by Mohsen Makhmalbaf
 Boycott (2001 film), an American film directed by Clark Johnson
 Boycott (2021 film), an American documentary film
 Boycott (novel), a 2012 novel by Colin C. Murphy
 Boycott, a 2020 album by Amazarashi